John McIntosh (August 15, 1777 – c. 1845) was a Scottish-Canadian farmer and fruit breeder, credited with discovering the McIntosh Red apple. Through the apple, his surname is the eponym of the Macintosh (or Mac) computers and operating systems by Apple Inc.

Early life
John McIntosh was born in Mohawk Valley near Harpersfield in the Province of New York in 1777, the son of a Scottish immigrant who was a loyalist during the American Revolution. McIntosh emigrated to Upper Canada sometime between 1795 and 1801 and settled in Matilda Township, now part of South Dundas Township. His four sons, David, Charles, Allan, and John served with the Dundas County Militia during the Upper Canada Rebellion, fighting at the Battle of the Windmill in 1838. His son Allan would continue growing the apples and expanded the orchards.

Discovery of the McIntosh apple
While clearing his property, McIntosh discovered a number of seedling apple trees growing wild. He transplanted them to his garden, and by the following year only one had survived. Several years later, the tree was producing the crisp, delicious fruit that is now well known. The discoverer eventually dubbed it the 'McIntosh Red', which is still the apple's official name.

McIntosh farmed the original property until his death, sometime between September 19, 1845 and January 10, 1846, near St. Lawrence Valley, Ontario.

Original tree 
The original tree that spawned this legacy was damaged by fire in 1894. The McIntosh family nursed the old tree along until 1908; the last year it produced a crop; and, in 1910, it fell over. A flat headstone now marks the spot where the stump had remained for years. At least three plaques commemorating the site's historic value are also located in the vicinity. In 1962, the Ontario Heritage Foundation erected a plaque outside the former McIntosh homestead.

In 2001 the Historic Sites and Monuments Board of Canada unveiled another plaque in a nearby park and declared the apple's discovery and development an "event of national historic importance." The park, which belongs to the Township of South Dundas, also features a large hand-painted mural depicting the apple's history.

External links 
 Ontario Plaques
 Biography at the Dictionary of Canadian Biography Online
 Ontario Heritage Foundation
 Vermont Apples
 Portrait drawing at the Ontario Agricultural Hall of Fame Association

1777 births
1840s deaths
19th-century Canadian people
Farmers from New York (state)
American emigrants to pre-Confederation Ontario
Canadian farmers
Canadian people of Scottish descent
American people of Scottish descent
History of agriculture in Ontario